Kanatove is a reserve air base of the Ukrainian Air Force located near Kropyvnytskyi, Kirovohrad Oblast, Ukraine.

History 
The base was previously used by the Soviet Air Forces:
 88th Fighter-Bomber Aviation Regiment between 1984 and 1987 as part of the 17th Air Army
 190th Fighter Aviation Regiment between 1960 and 1990 as part of the 138th Fighter Aviation Division.
 727th Guards Bomber Aviation Regiment between July 1987 and January 1992 as part of the 32nd Bomber Aviation Division

2022 invasion
On 5 May, during the 2022 Russian invasion of Ukraine, the Russian Defence Ministry claimed that its missiles destroyed aviation equipment at the Kanatovo airfield.

References

Ukrainian airbases
Kirovohrad Oblast